Conaway is an unincorporated community in Tyler County, West Virginia, United States along Elk Fork. Its post office (established December 21, 1868, and discontinued October 15, 1913) is closed.

References 

Unincorporated communities in Tyler County, West Virginia
Unincorporated communities in West Virginia